Tschilp is a Hamburg/Germany-based indie rock band. Members are Wibke Tiarks(Guitar/Singer), Nina Istok(Drums/Metallophon) and Kerstin Schroedinger (Bass/Singer). They use guitars, drums, bass and a repetition tool.
Tschilp have made music together since 2002. Since then they've been travelling around Europe with friends, such as 60 stories from Canada, karl-heinz from Hamburg or ninetynine from Australia and have played more than 100 concerts. They release their records on Fidel Bastro.

Discography 
 2007 s/t 7" on Fidel Batro records
 2009 Whole days in the trees on Fidel Bastro records

References

External links
 http://www.tschilp.org Official website
  record review 

German musical groups